Kim Sae-ron (born July 31, 2000) is a South Korean actress. She began her career when she was nine years old and became a popular child star through the films A Brand New Life (2009) and The Man From Nowhere (2010). As Kim reached her teenage years, she was cast in more leading roles, notably in the film A Girl at My Door (2014). She has also starred in television drama series, including Listen to My Heart (2011), The Queen's Classroom (2013) and Hi! School-Love On (2014). Her first adult lead role was in the television drama Secret Healer (2016).

Early life and education

Kim has two younger sisters, Ah-ron and Ye-ron, who are also actresses. She attended Miyang Elementary School in Seoul, and graduated from Yang-il Middle School in Ilsan in February 2016. She then began attending School of Performing Arts Seoul. In 2018, Kim was admitted to Chung-Ang University, the Department of Performing Arts and Film Studies.

Career

2009–2014: Beginnings as a child actress
Kim's first acting role was in the 2009 film A Brand New Life, directed by the French-Korean filmmaker Ounie Lecomte and loosely based on her life. Kim played the main character, a nine-year-old girl named Jin-hee, who is abandoned by her father at an orphanage after he remarries, and is later adopted by a French couple. Kim attended the Cannes Film Festival when the film was shown there in a special screening, becoming the youngest actress to be invited to the festival. She then co-starred with Won Bin in The Man From Nowhere, which was the highest-grossing film in South Korea in 2010. She played Jung So-mi, the daughter of a heroin addict who is kidnapped by an organized crime ring. During filming, she was only allowed to watch her own scenes on the monitor. Kim won several awards for her first two roles, including Best New Actress at the Korean Film Awards and Buil Film Awards.

In 2011, Kim  was in another crime film, I Am a Dad, playing the daughter of Kim Seung-woo. She had her first television role in the drama series Listen to My Heart, playing the younger version of Hwang Jung-eum's character. She appeared in the first four episodes, and her performance was praised by TV critics. Her next role was in the drama film , alongside her sister Ah-ron. The film is about international adoption, and was the first Korean film to win Best Film at the Giffoni International Film Festival in 2012. Kim then had a dual role in the thriller film The Neighbor, playing a murder victim and the serial killer's next target. In 2013, she played a student in the television drama The Queen's Classroom, which won her a Best Young Actress Award at the 2013 MBC Drama Awards (shared with three fellow cast members).

In a 2014 interview, Kim's manager said Kim had "a great eye for good scripts which made it possible for her to choose her own projects at a very young age". Kim also stated that she never had difficulty accepting difficult roles and was able to slowly immerse herself in the characters. Her first role of the year was in the documentary-drama film Manshin: Ten Thousand Spirits, reenacting the teenage version of shamanist Kim Geum-hwa. She then played a victim of bullying and domestic violence in the film A Girl at My Door. She accepted the role because she liked the script was attracted to the character. Kim attended the Cannes Film Festival for the second time when the film premiered there as an Un Certain Regard official selection. Her performance was praised by critics—Variety called it "mesmerizing" and Twitch Film noted she had shown more layers and depth compared to her previous roles. Also in 2014, she starred in the teen fantasy-romance television series Hi! School: Love On as an angel who becomes human, and the thriller film Manhole, playing a hearing impaired girl who is kidnapped by a serial killer.

2015–present: Acclaim and transition to lead roles
In 2015, Kim had a lead role in the Drama City television special, Snowy Road. The two-part drama series is about the "comfort women" in Korea under Japanese rule during World War II, and was later released as a film in theaters. Kim's performance as a 15-year-old comfort woman was praised by both critics and viewers, and she was awarded Best Actress in a Foreign Film at the Golden Rooster and Hundred Flowers Film Festival. She then played the main character in the television series To Be Continued and the younger version of Choi Kang-hee's character in Glamorous Temptation. She was cast in her first adult role in the 2016 television drama series, Secret Healer, playing a cursed Joseon-era princess. Her character has a fictional romance with Heo Jun, played by Yoon Shi-yoon, who is 14 years Kim's senior.

In November 2016, Kim signed with YG Entertainment. In 2018, Kim starred in the thriller film The Villagers. In 2019, Kim starred in the fourth season of the campus web drama Love Playlist. The same year she starred in the thriller drama Leverage, based on the American drama of the same name.

In November 2019, it was reported that Kim's contract with YG Entertainment has expired, and that she would be leaving the company. In January 2020, Kim signed with Gold Medalist along with actors Kim Soo-hyun and Seo Yea-ji.

In May 2021, Kim was confirmed to take the female lead role in the upcoming 12-episode web series Excellent Shaman Ga Doo-shim, with Nam Da-reum portraying the male main lead.

In April 2022, she was cast in the SBS drama Trolley. However, later in May 2022, she left the project after crashing her vehicle and subsequently having drunk driving charges filed against her.

In December 2022, Kim has decided not to renew her contract with Gold Medalist.

Controversy 
In May 2022, Kim Sae-ron was driving under the influence in Gangnam-gu, Seoul around 8:00 am, she crashed into several structures including transformers, guard rails and street trees. In the accident, the transformer broke down, and the electricity supply was cut off for about 3 hours at 57 places including nearby shops, causing damage to merchants. The following day, her agency, Gold Medalist released a statement saying that, "Kim Sae-ron is deeply reflecting on her apparent mistake. The damage caused by the accident is being compensated as much as possible. I will do my best to take responsibility until the end."

Following a series of similar accusations, Kim Sae-ron posted a hand-written apology to her Instagram account on May 19, 2022. She stated:It was later reported that she left the project in the television series Trolley. On November 4, 2022, it was reported all the money that Kim had accumulated during her activities was used as compensation in the accident handling and settlement process, and she had a part-time job. Later, Gold Medalist confirmed that Kim Sae-ron had a part-time job because her life was difficult, but currently has stopped.

On March 8, 2023, the prosecutor of Seoul Central District Court asked for a fine of 20 million won. Later, Kim appealed for leniency due to financial difficulties and requested a fine of 4 million won from Mr. A, who was riding with her.

Filmography

Discography

Awards and nominations

References

External links

 
 

2000 births
South Korean film actresses
South Korean television actresses
South Korean child actresses
South Korean web series actresses
21st-century South Korean actresses
Living people